In biochemistry, a dual-specificity kinase is a kinase that can act as both tyrosine kinase and serine/threonine kinase.

MEKs, involved in MAP pathways, are principal examples of dual-specificity kinases. Other common examples include:
 ADK1 (Arabidopsis dual specificity kinase 1)
 CLK1, CLK2, CLK3, CLK4
 DSTYK
 DYRK1A, DYRK1B, DYRK2, DYRK3, DYRK4
 Mps1p
 TESK1, TESK2
 TTK

The systematic name of this enzyme class is ATP:protein phosphotransferase (Ser/Thr- and Tyr-phosphorylating).

References

 
 
 
 
 

EC 2.7.12
Enzymes of unknown structure